The Micronesian ambassador in Washington, D. C. is the official representative of the Government in Palikir to the Government of the United States.

List of representatives

References 

 
United States
Federated States of Micronesia